Pratten Park is a sporting complex in the Sydney suburb of Ashfield. It was officially opened on 12 September 1912 by the Governor of New South Wales, Frederic Thesiger.

Pratten Park was named after Herbert Pratten, an alderman and then mayor of Ashfield. The first ever rugby league match at Pratten Park was Western Suburbs vs Annandale on 24 August 1912, with a crowd of 500 people. Annandale won the match 15–6.

The park is best known as the original home of the Western Suburbs Magpies rugby league team, who played there from 1912 to 1966 and then sporadically from 1971 to 1973 and in 1977 and 1985. The final first grade rugby league match played at the park was on 18 August 1985, where Wests played Penrith, who won the match 42–16. In total, 353 first grade games were played at Pratten Park. 

Pratten Park has also hosted National Soccer League matches and was the home ground of Sydney Olympic FC for a brief period in the 1980s. The ground has also been used for lower league NSW Soccer matches.

Its highest attendance for a rugby league match was 12,407 in a 1964 New South Wales Rugby Football League season game between Western Suburbs and St George, and 13,556 for a soccer game in 1984 between Sydney Olympic and APIA Leichhardt FC.

The ground is still home to the Western Suburbs District Cricket Club. Over the years, the club has had Michael Clarke and Bob Simpson among its playing ranks.

Facilities 
Pratten Park has very basic facilities. There is a small grandstand in the north-western corner with the rest of the ground surrounded by grass hills. Over a number of years the grandstand fell into disrepair and was eventually closed, but restoration work saw it re-opened in late 2007.

Sources

 www.westsmagpies.com.au

References

Sports venues in Sydney
Rugby league stadiums in Australia
Western Suburbs Magpies
1912 establishments in Australia
Sports venues completed in 1912
Cricket grounds in Australia